Sillago suezensis is a species of marine fish in the smelt-whiting family Sillaginidae. It is found in western Indian Ocean and in the northern Red Sea including the Gulf of Suez. Following its first record in the Mediterranean Sea, off Lebanon in 1977, it experienced a population explosion in Levantine waters where it is now very common and reaches to the Aegean Sea.

References

Sillaginidae
Taxa named by Daniel Golani
Taxa named by Ronald Fricke
Taxa named by Yaron Tikochinski
Fish described in 2013